Malacoraja, or soft skates, is a small genus of skates in the family Rajidae found at depths of  in the Atlantic.  It currently consists of four described species, as well as a possible undescribed species.

Species 
 Malacoraja kreffti (Stehmann, 1978) (Krefft's skate)
 Malacoraja obscura M. R. de Carvalho, U. L. Gomes & Gadig, 2005 (Brazilian soft skate)
 Malacoraja senta (Garman, 1885) (Smooth skate)
 Malacoraja spinacidermis (Barnard, 1923) (Soft skate)

References 

Rajiformes
Ray genera